Sáric is a small town in Sáric Municipality, located in the extreme north of the Mexican state of Sonora. In 2010, it had a population of 892.

References
 2010 census tables: INEGI

Populated places in Sonora
Populated places in the Sonoran Desert of Mexico